The following is a list of wild edible plants in Mongolian cuisine:

Oil
 Cannabis sativa

Cereal

 Abutilon theophrasti
 Agriophyllus arenarium
 Artemisia anethifolia
 Artemisia annua
 Artemisia pectina
 Artemisia xerophytica
 Convolvulus gortschakovii
 Corispermum mongolicum
 Elymus giganteus
 Fagopyrum esculentum
 Kalidium foliatum
 Polygonum alpinum
 Polygonum sibiricum
 Psammochloa villosa

Fruits and berries
 Amygdalus mongolica
 Crataegus sanguinea
 Elaeagnus angustifolia
 Ephedra sinica
 Fragaria orientalis
 Grossularia acicularis
 Hippophae rhamnoides 
 Malus baccata
 Malus pallasiana
 Nitaria Roborowskii 
 Oxycoccus microcarpus 
 Padus asiatica
 Prunus armeniaca sibirica
 Ribes altissimum
 Ribes nigrum
 Ribes rubrum
 Rubus sachalinensis
 Sorbus sibirica
 Vaccinium vitisidaea

Mushrooms
 Psalliota arvensis
 Psalliota campestris

Onion family
 Allium altacium
 Allium anisopodium
 Allium fischeri
 Allium lineare
 Allium macrostemon
 Allium ramosum
 Allium prostratum
 Allium senescens
 Allium victorialis

Nuts
 Pinus sibrica

Spices
 Carum buriaticum
 Schizonepeta annua

Tea substitutes
 Bergenia crassifolia
 Betula gmelinii
 Chamaenerion angustifolium
 Dasiphora fruticosa
 Dendranthema indicum
 Geranium pseudosibiricum
 Lagopsis supina
 Lycium chinense
 Paeonia anomala
 Populus tremula
 Serratula cardunculus
 Spiraea media

Starchy plants
 Agropyron repens
 Asparagus dahuricum
 Butomus umbellatus
 Cirsium esculentum
 Lilium martagon
 Lilium tenuifolium
 Phlomis tuberosa
 Phragmites communis
 Polygonum divaricatum
 Polygonum viviparum rhizome
 Potentilla anserina root
 Rumex altaicum
 Rumex compactum
 Rumex undulatum
 Sanguisorba officinalis root
 Sinomorium songaricum
 Sphallerocarpus gracilis
 Typha laxmanni

Sweeteners
 Glycyrrhiza uralensis

Snacks
 Corylus heterophylla
 Cyanchum chinense
 Erodium stephanianum
 Juglans mandshurica

Greens
 Cynanchum sibiricum
 Heracleum dissectum
 Rheum nanum
 Rumex acetosa
 Polygonum aviculare
 Urtica angustifolia

Vegetables
 Adenophora remotiflora
 Adenophora polyantha
 Amaranthus retroflexus
 Armeniaca sibirica
 Artemisia frigida
 Athyrium brevifrons
 Caltha palustris
 Chenopodium acuminatum
 Chenopodium album
 Cirsium setosum
 Codonopsis lanceolata
 Crategus pinnatifida
 Cyanchum thesiodes
 Ferula bungeana
 Hemerocallis minor
 Hemiptelea davidii
 Kochia scoparia
 Lespedeza davurica
 Lilum pumilum
 Malva verticillata
 Oenanthe javanica

References
Rinchen, 1905-1977, author. Mongol Ard Ulsyn ugsaatny sudlal, khėlnii shinzhlėliĭn atlas / Bi︠a︡mbyn Rinchen. Ulaanbaatar : Mongol Sudlalyn U̇ndėsnii Zȯvlȯl, 2015. 
Sachula et al. “Wild edible plants collected and consumed by the locals in Daqinggou, Inner Mongolia, China.” Journal of ethnobiology and ethnomedicine vol. 16,1 60. 9 Oct. 2020, doi:10.1186/s13002-020-00411-2

Edible plants
Mongolian cuisine